Homotomidae is a family of bugs in the superfamily Psylloidea.

References

External links 

Psylloidea
Hemiptera families